Pulagam Chinnarayana is an Indian Telugu cinema journalist, author, film critic, lyricist, dialogue writer and a public relations officer. He started his career as a film journalist for the magazines Sivaranjani, Number One, Chitram, Santhosham. Later, he worked for Sakshi for eight years where he reached a level of in-charge from being a regular reporter. He authored various Telugu books on Telugu Cinema like Jandhya Marutham, Aanaati Aanavaallu, Cine Poornodayam, Svarnayuga Sangeetha Darshakulu, Pasidi Thera, Cinema Venuka Storeelu, Maya Bazar Madhura Smruthulu and " Vendi Chandamamalu ". He won Nandi Award for Best Book on Telugu Cinema from Andhra Pradesh state Government twice for his books Aanaati Aanavaallu and Pasidi Thera in 2009 and 2015 respectively. He also won Nandi Award for Best Critic in 2014.

Literary career 

Chinnarayana authored Jandhya Marutham as his first book which was a compilation of 39 films directed by Jandhyala. It had a foreword written by actor Chiranjeevi. It was the first time Chiranjeevi wrote foreword for a book. It was launched at State Art Gallery in Hyderabad organized by Hasam magazine. Actors Chiranjeevi and Rajendra Prasad attended the function, where the former launched the book.

Chinnarayana then authored Aanaati Aanavaallu as his second book which had a foreword written by director Trivikram Srinivas. Within a month of release, all the copies of first print were sold out and this book went for second print. He won Nandi Award for Best Book on Telugu Cinema from Andhra Pradesh state Government for this book, in 2009 and 2016. His next work Cine Poornodayam which was based on life of Edida Nageswara Rao, owner of Poornodaya Creations was successful.

On music directors who worked between 1932 and 1982, Chinnarayana wrote Svarnayuga Sangeetha Darshakulu which was proofread by singer S.P. Balasubrahmanyam. Music director M.M. Keeravani wrote the foreword for this book. Later, Chinnarayana came up with Pasidi Thera which was a compilation of details about 100 films and a sequel to Aanaati Aanavaallu and Cinema Venuka Storeelu which had background details of films made after 2000. Among them, he won Nandi Award for Best Book on Telugu Cinema from Andhra Pradesh state Government for Pasidi Thera, in 2016.

Later, Chinnarayana authored Maya Bazar Madhura Smruthulu, a book on film Mayabazar by associating with Viswanatha Reddy, son of film's producer Nagi Reddy. Chinnarayana made a documentary along with the book and he got commendation from Vice President of India Venkaiah Naidu.

Chinnarayana authored Vendi Chandamamalu along with another writer Vaddi Om Prakash Narayana. It has information about Venditera Navalalu which is the term for novels about a film between 50s and 70s in Telugu cinema. This book was released on 2 October 2019 by director Vamsy and first copy was received by Ravi Prasad Paadi, a higher level official of South Central Railway.

In the year 2021, the first look of his upcoming book Jai Vittalacharya was launched by Krishna (Telugu actor) which is based on the cinematic journey of legendary director B. Vittalacharya.

Publications 

Chinnarayana authored the following books on Telugu cinema.

 Jandhya Marutham
 Aanaati Aanavaallu
 Cine Poornodayam
 Swarnayuga Sangeetha Darshakulu
 Pasidi Thera
 Cinema Venuka Storeelu
 Maya Bazar Madhura Smruthulu
 Vendi Chandamamalu
Jai Vittalacharya

Film career 

Chinnarayana started is continuing as public relations officer, dialogue writer and lyricist for Telugu cinema. As he was acquainted with Puri Jagannadh during the film Badri, he worked on the film Itlu Sravani Subramanyam as a PRO for the first time. He then worked on Nuvvu Nenu, directed by Teja and worked as PRO for more than 300 films till date. He is the permanent PRO for actors Ram Pothineni and Kartikeya Gummakonda. He turned lyricist with Mahesh, starring Sundeep Kishan. He turned dialogue writer with Prema Oka Maikam starring Charmy Kaur and is currently penning dialogues for Yashoda starring Samantha Ruth Prabhu.

As lyricist

As dialogue writer

Awards and recognition
2006 Santosham Film Awards as a Best Journalist and PRO Award (for Pokiri)
2007 A.P Cinegoers 36th Annual Film Awards for Best Film Journalist Award.
2009 Nandi Award for Best Book on Telugu Cinema (for Aanati Aanavaallu) 
2014 Nandi Award for Best Film Critic
2016 Nandi Award for Best Book on Telugu Cinema ( for Pasidi Tera)

References

External links
 
 
 

Living people
Telugu-language lyricists
Telugu screenwriters
Screenwriters from Andhra Pradesh
Indian male screenwriters
1982 births
Nandi Award winners
People from West Godavari district
Telugu-language journalists
Journalists from Andhra Pradesh
Indian film critics